Joseph Chan Ho-lim is Under Secretary for Financial Services and the Treasury, and a former member of the Central and Western District Council (Peak Constituency).

Education, qualifications and work experience
After finishing secondary school at Wah Yan College, Hong Kong, Chan went to the University of Michigan studying economics (honors) and psychology double degree. He is also a Chartered Financial Analyst (CFA) Chartered Holder.

After graduation he started his career in the financial sector at Merrill Lynch (Asia Pacific), where he was promoted to vice president in just five years. In 2005 at the age of 28, Joseph became a managing director at Bear Stearns Asia. He was then the industry's youngest investment banker with such corporate title. In 2008 he joined Standard Chartered Bank as managing director of Financial Markets and subsequently in 2016 he joined Credit Agricole Corporate & Investment Bank as managing director of Global Markets Division.

Chan joined the Liberal Party in 2009, and was first elected as a District Council member in 2011. By a large margin of 1505–820, he defeated Civic Party Tanya Chan (member of both District Council and Legislative Council) in the Peak Constituency. With the reputation of hardworking and devoted service to residents, Chan was re-elected in 2015 with a landslide victory of 1837–317. He got the highest percentage of votes in the Hong Kong Island area of the District Council.

Controversies

On 5 January 2022, Carrie Lam announced new warnings and restrictions against social gathering due to potential COVID-19 outbreaks. One day later, it was discovered that Chan attended a birthday party hosted by Witman Hung Wai-man, with 222 guests.  At least one guest tested positive with COVID-19, causing all guests to be quarantined.

Political positions
 Liberal Party: Member, Central Committee
 Liberal Party: Convener, Economy Panel

District Council services
Central and Western District Council: Elected Member (Peak Constituency)
Central and Western District Council: Vice Chairman, Traffic & Transport Committee
Central and Western District Council: Chairman, Working Group on Environmental Improvement, Greening and Beautification Works in C&W District 
  Central & Western Mid-Levels Owners Association:  Honorary Advisor
Central and Western District Fight Crime Committee: Member
Central and Mid-Levels Area Committee:  Member

Public services
Trade and Industry Department (TID): Member, Small & Medium Enterprise Committee
The Hong Kong General Chamber of Commerce (HKGCC): Vice President, Young Executives Club; Member, Environment & Sustainability Committee; Co-opted Member, Small & Medium Enterprises Committee
The Hong Kong Society of Financial Analysts (HKSFA): Vice President; Board of Directors; chairman, Continuing Education Committee
 Hong Kong Securities and Investment Institute(HKSI): Board of Directors; chairman, Membership Committee
The Chinese Gold & Silver Exchange Society (CGSE): Advisor; Member, Registration Committee
Hong Kong Arts Centre(HKAC): Board of Governors
Environment and Conservation Fund:Member, Investment Committee; Member, Waste Reduction Projects Vetting Subcommittee
Scout Association of Hong Kong: Member, Finance Committee; Vice Chairman, Kowloon Regions; chairman, Kowloon Regions Estate Committee; Vice Chairman Hong Kong Island Regions Finance and Raising Group Committee
The University of Hong Kong(HKU): Instructor, School of Economics and Finance Mentorship Programme
Wah Yan (Hong Kong ) Past Students Association: Convener, Finance Fraternity

References

External links 
 YouTube District Council Election Forums: Central & Western（Peak Constituency）Tanya Chan vs Joseph Chan
 YouTube NowTV 2015 District Council Election Forums – Central & Western（Peak Constituency） : Chan Shu Moon vs Joseph Chan (part1)
 YouTube NowTV 2015 District Council Election Forums – Central & Western（Peak Constituency）: Chan Shu Moon vs Joseph Chan (part2)

University of Michigan College of Literature, Science, and the Arts alumni
1977 births
Living people
Government officials of Hong Kong
District councillors of Central and Western District
Liberal Party (Hong Kong) politicians
Members of the Election Committee of Hong Kong, 2017–2021
CFA charterholders